Andrew Shull (born April 2, 1981) is a former professional American football defensive end in the National Football League. He played for the Detroit Lions on their practice squad.

Early years 
Shull was born in Webb City, Missouri. He attended Webb City High School and helped Cardinals to 14-0 record and state title in 1997.  He was recently inducted into the Webb City High School Athletic Hall of Fame.

College career 
Shull ended his career at Kansas State with 150 tackles (39 for losses), 20 sacks, 15 deflected passes, five forced fumbles, three fumbles recovered and a blocked kick. He led the team in sacks in 2002 and 2003 and currently ranks sixth in school history in sacks.

NFL career

Pre-draft
Shull measured 6'4½" and 265 pounds and ran a 40-yard dash in 4.87.

Detroit Lions
Shull was undrafted in 2004 but was signed by the Detroit Lions as a free agent on April 26, 2004.

References 

Webb City High School - Webb City High School Homepage
Andrew Shull official website

1981 births
Living people
Detroit Lions players
American football defensive ends
Kansas State Wildcats football players
People from Webb City, Missouri